Shawn Spencer Burks (born February 10, 1963) is a former American football linebacker in the National Football League for the Washington Redskins.  He played college football at Louisiana State University.

References

1963 births
Living people
American football linebackers
LSU Tigers football players
Players of American football from Baton Rouge, Louisiana
Washington Redskins players